Athoracophoridae, common name the leaf-veined slugs, are a family of air-breathing land slugs, terrestrial pulmonate gastropod mollusks in the infraorder Stylommatophora, the stalk-eyed snails and slugs. Many of the species have an attractive pattern on their dorsal surface which resembles the veins in a leaf, hence the common name.

Athoracophoridae is the only family in the superfamily Athoracophoroidea.

Leaf-veined slugs live on the various land masses and islands in the south-west Pacific area.

The scientific name Athoracophoridae is derived from prefix "a-", that means "without" and from a Greek word "", that means "breastplate". This is a reference to the fact that the mantle in these slugs is small and not well delineated; it does not have the obvious, saddle-shaped or breast-plate-shaped appearance that it does in most other land slug groups.

Anatomy
In the family Athoracophoridae (in subfamily Aneitinae and in subfamily Athoracophorinae), the number of haploid chromosomes lies between 36 and 45 (according to the values in this table). While they belong to the pulmonate snails, they lack a true lung. The vascularized mantle cavity is reduced, and a series of blind tubules radiate from it, being surrounded blood vessels. This allows for a more compact lung structure in these generally flat animals.

Distribution
Species in this family are found in eastern Australia, New Zealand including its sub-Antarctic islands, Bismarck Archipelago, the Admiralty Islands, the New Hebrides, New Caledonia, as well as on the Melanesian islands north to New Caledonia and New Britain, Papua New Guinea.

Taxonomy
The following two subfamilies have been recognized in the taxonomy of Bouchet & Rocroi (2005), that follows classification after Grimpe & Hoffmann (1925):
 Athoracophorinae P. Fischer, 1883 (1860) - synonym: Janellidae Gray, 1853 (inv.) - a subantarctic subfamily
 Aneitinae Gray, 1860 - a northern subfamily

The name Athoracophoridae has precedence over the name Aneitidae, because Athoracophoridae is in prevailing usage.

Genera
Genera within the family Athoracophoridae include:
 Aneitea Gray, 1860
 Aneitea sarasini
 Athoracophorus Gould, 1852 - the type genus, 3 species
 Palliopodex Burton, 1963 - with the only species Palliopodex verrucosus (Simroth, 1889) 
 Pseudaneitea Cockerell, 1891
 Reflectopallium Burton, 1963
 Triboniophorus Humbert, 1863

See also
 Alaninema ngata, a nematode which is an intestinal parasite in slugs of this family

References

Further reading
 Burch J. B. (1968). "Tentacle retraction in Tracheopulmonata". Journal of the Malacological Society of Australia 1(11): 62-67.
 Burch J. B. & Patterson C. M. (1969). "Systematic position of the Athoracophoridae (Gastropoda : Euthyneura)". Malacologia 9: 259-260.
 Burton D. W. (1962). "New Zealand land slugs — Part 1". Tuatara 9(8): 87-97.
 Burton D. W. (1963). "New Zealand Land Slugs — Part 2". Tuatara 11(2): 90-96.
 Burton D. W. (1980). "Anatomical studies on Australian, New Zealand and sub-antarctic Athoracophoridae (Gastropoda : Pulmonata)". New Zealand Journal of Zoology 7: 173-198.
 Burton D. W. (1981). "Pallial systems in the Athoracophoridae (Gastropoda: Pulmonata)". New Zealand Journal of Zoology 8: 391-402.
 Forcart L. (1973). "Notes on Veronicellidae and Athoracophoridae in Field Museum of Natural History, Chicago". Nautilus 87: 25-27.
 Grimpe G. & Hoffmann H. (1924). "Diagnosen neuer Athoracophoriden (Gastropoda, Pulmonata)". Zoologischer Anzeiger 58: 171-177.
 Oberzeller E. (1970). "Ergebnisse der Österreichischen Neukaledonien-Expedition 1965. Terrestrische Gastropoda II: Veronicellidae und Athoracophoridae." Annalen des Naturhistorischen Museums in Wien 74: 325-341. PDF.
 Plate L. H. (1898). "Beitrage zur Anatomie und Systematik der Janelliden". Zoologische Jahrbucher. Abtheilung fur Anatomie und Ontogenie der Thiere (Jena) XI: 193-269.
 Suter H. (1897). "A revision of New Zealand Athoracophoridae". Journal of Molluscan Studies 2(6): 245-257. abstract.
 Suter H. (1913). Manual of the New Zealand Mollusca. (Athoracophoridae, pp. 789-808, pl. 31, figs. 3-13.)
 Stanisic J. (1998). "Family Athoracophoridae". pp. 1109-1110. In: Beesley P. L., Ross G. J. B. & Wells A. (eds). Mollusca: The Southern Synthesis. Fauna of Australia. Melbourne, CSIRO Publishing Vol. 5, Part B, pp. vi-viii, 565-1234.

External links

 "Athoracophoridae". Australian Government.
 AMNH